Hosa Prem (Assamese: সঁচা প্রেম), English title 'Capturing True Love' is an Assamese language romantic comedy film by Pramod Sahoo released on 5 January 2018. The film is written by Pramod Sahoo and produced by Aabegg Entertainment Pvt Ltd.  It stars Shree Brojen Bora, Kalpa Jyoti Gogoi and Tapashree Kalita in lead roles.

Cast 

Shree Brojen Bora as Major Mahaaan
Kalpa Jyoti Gogoi as Hero
Tapashree Kalita as Heroine
Manas Sarma as Camera Das
Rajiv Kro as Sikai Senapati
Sangina Brahma as Amlokhi
Raj Bidya as Fiancée
Syamalima Das as B.B.C
Safikul Haque as Zubeen Rahman
Rahul das (khaplang kai) as lollipop
Nandita Boruah as chewing gum
Adrika P.S as Maina

Production

Development 
The story development of Assamese film 'Hosa Prem' started in January 2016. The story discussion took place at Geeta Mandir Namghar, Guwahati, Assam, India where the story team sat together for several weeks until the first draft was ready for review.

Filming 
Muhurat of the film took place at Jyoti Chitraban Film Studio, Assam, India on 13 February 2017. Filming began on 15 February 2017 at Jyoti Chitraban Film Studio, and other action was shot in Guwahati city in the middle of heavy traffic like a guerrilla filmmaking technique, finishing in one place and moving rapidly to another, aiming to shoot as many scenes as possible each day. A Bollywood action director and a cable group were brought in from Mumbai, India to shoot various action sequences. For the first time in Assamese cinema all seven states of North East India are represented in one movie along with dialogues in all seven languages of Arunachal Pradesh, Assam, Manipur, Meghalaya, Mizoram, Nagaland and Tripura.

Music

Score 
Background score of the film is composed by Rajiv Kashyap.

Soundtrack 
The soundtrack is composed by Babli Haque and features playback singer Zubeen Garg and Krishna Raaz.

Lyrics 
Lyrics for the title song of the film is penned down by Krishna Raaz and Disco song is written and composed by Rekibul Hassan.

Track listing

It is mentioned that Hosa Prem Disco song is the world's first song created (almost) entirely out of Assamese movie names.

References

External links
 Official website
 

Indian romantic comedy films
2010s Assamese-language films
2018 romantic comedy films